Carl Friedrich von Pückler-Burghauss (October 7, 1886 – 12 May 1945) was a German politician and a SS functionary during the Nazi era. He was a member of the German parliament during the Weimar Republic. During World War II, Pückler-Burghauss was chief of the Waffen-SS units in the Protectorate of Bohemia and Moravia and also temporarily commanded the Latvian Division of the Waffen-SS.

Life 
Born in Upper Silesia, Carl Friedrich was the son of Count Friedrich von Pückler-Burghaus (1849-1920), a retired major in the Prussian Army, and his wife, Ella von Köppen (1862-1899). At the time, his father was district governor in Friedland. Carl Friedrich attended the high school in Breslau and later studied law in Bonn. On 20 May 1913, he married his 5th cousin, Princess Olga Elisabeth of Saxe-Altenburg (1886-1955), member of the House of Wettin, daughter of Prince Albert of Saxe-Altenburg and Princess Marie of Prussia. Together, they had two daughters and one son:
Baroness Ella-Viola von Pückler-Burghauss (b. 8 April 1914- d. 4 April 1982, Oberaudorf). She married Andreas von Flotow (b. 16 April 1913, Brussels - d. 14 September 1990) on 3 November 1941. They had three children:
Adrian von Flotow (b. 5 June 1943). Married firstly Sylvia Kolck (b. 27 March 1945) on 10 July 1968 in Siggen. They had one son before divorcing in 1976. He then married secondly, Marie-Elisabeth von Sennyey (b. 17 October 1947, Vienna) on 12 May 1978 in Wangen im Allgäu. They had two daughters before divorcing in 2019.
Constantin von Flotow (b. 1969, Brussels)
Stephanie von Flotow (b. 18 December 1980, Brussels)
Marie Sophie von Flotow (b. 13 December 1982).
Viola von Flotow (b. 27 March 1945, Prague). She married Jan Peter Ratdke (b. 22 February 1944) on 5 May 1977.  They had two daughters:
Elle-Jesslyn Ratdke (b. 3 November 1977)
Ann-Leonie Ratdke (b. 1 December 1981)
Cyrill von Flotow (b. 1 December 1955, Nonnenhorn). He married Elke Ritter (b. 23 August 1953, Lustenau) on 25 April 1980 in Wangen im Allgäu. They had two sons:
Dominic von Flotow (b. 6 October 1981)
Sandro von Flotow (b. 22 November 1987, Lübbecke)
Baroness Eleonore-Renata von Pückler-Burghauss (b. 25 November 1919 - d. 1997). She married firstly, Manfred von Schröder (b. 6 November 1914) on 9 September 1939. They had two children before they divorced in 1948.She married secondly, Jurgen Petersen (b. 13 September 1913 - d. 5 September 1987) on 21 April 1949. They had two sons.
Karoline-Eleonore von Schröder (b. 26 September 1940). She married Rudolf Menzel (b. 10 August 1924) on 12 June 1965. They had two sons:
Robin Menzel (b. 29 June 1966, Stamford)
Johann Menzel (b. 16 July 1968, Washington)
Rudiger von Schröder (b. 10 March 1943 - d. 30 October 2020, Frankfurt-am-Main). He married Xenia Blum and they had three children:
Luisa von Schröder (b. 31 July 1982, Luxembourg)
Heinrich von Schröder (b. 6 July 1984, Luxembourg)
Helena von Schröder (b. 28 December 1988)
Marcus Petersen (b. 6 December 1950 - d. 20 July 2005)
Sylvius Petersen (b. 12 January 1959). He married Andrea Bunemann (b. 12 July 1959) on 12 January 1990. They had one son before divorcing in 1993.
Jasper Petersen (b. 21 December 1992)
Count Carl Rüdiger who died few months after his birth in 1923.

Career 
Pückler-Burghauss entered the Cuirassier Regiment in Breslau in 1908. The following year, he was promoted to second lieutenant. He served in the infantry during World War I and won the Iron Cross 1st Class. He left the army in 1919 as a captain and served with reserve Freikorps units until 1931, when he joined the Nazi Party and the SA. From the election in March 1933 until November 1933, he was a member of the German Parliament, representing District 9 (Oppeln). After other political parties were banned in July 1933, new elections were held in November 1933, but Pückler-Burghauss was not nominated.

He joined the SS in 1940 and, after finishing the police course, became adjutant to the SS and police leader Erich von dem Bach-Zelewski in the Army Group Centre Rear Area. In 1942, he was appointed chief of the Waffen-SS units in the Protectorate of Bohemia and Moravia. From 1943 to 1944, he also commanded the newly created Latvian Division, but was replaced before the division went into combat. During the Prague uprising in May 1945, Pückler-Burghauss represented the hardline of the SS.

Death 
Contravening the terms of Germany's capitulation taking effect 8 May, Pückler-Burghauss moved west in an attempt to surrender to the Americans. Their refusal resulted in the Battle of Slivice, in which the Germans were defeated. He signed a capitulation on 12 May, the last document of surrender of World War II in Europe. Shortly afterwards, he shot himself along with some of his staff.

References 

1886 births
1945 suicides
People from Nysa County
SS-Gruppenführer
Waffen-SS personnel
Prussian Army personnel
Counts of Germany
Weimar Republic politicians
Members of the Reichstag of the Weimar Republic
German Army personnel of World War I
Nazis who committed suicide
Suicides in Czechoslovakia